Shahkot Assembly constituency (Sl. No.: 32) is a Punjab Legislative Assembly constituency in 
Jalandhar district, Punjab state, India.

Members of Legislative Assembly

^: by-election

Election Result

2022

2018

2017

See also
 List of constituencies of the Punjab Legislative Assembly
 Jalandhar district

References

External links
  

Assembly constituencies of Punjab, India
Jalandhar district